Bartłomiej Konieczny (born 9 June 1981) is a Polish former footballer.

External links
 

1981 births
Living people
Polish footballers
Amica Wronki players
Warta Poznań players
Kania Gostyń players
Widzew Łódź players
Górnik Polkowice players
Polonia Warsaw players
Podbeskidzie Bielsko-Biała players
Association football defenders
Ekstraklasa players
People from Skwierzyna
Sportspeople from Lubusz Voivodeship